Agony in the Garden is a painting by the Italian artist Andrea Mantegna between 1458 and 1460. It is conserved at the National Gallery in London.

Mantegna's brother-in-law, Renaissance artist Giovanni Bellini, is considered to have been inspired by this painting for his own rendering of Agony in the Garden, painted between 1460 and 1465. Both paintings are conserved at the National Gallery in London.

Paintings by Andrea Mantegna
1450s paintings
Mantegna
Collections of the National Gallery, London
Angels in art
Birds in art
Rabbits and hares in art
Paintings depicting Saint Peter